Jack Oosterlaak (Justus Kinloch Ayres Oosterlaak; 15 January 1896, in Wellington – 5 June 1968), was a South African athlete who competed mainly in the 400 metres.

He competed for South Africa in the 1920 Summer Olympics held in Antwerp, Belgium in the 4 x 400-metre relay where he won the silver medal with his teammates Harry Davel, Clarence Oldfield and Bevil Rudd.

References

1896 births
1968 deaths
People from Wellington, Western Cape
South African male sprinters
Olympic silver medalists for South Africa
Athletes (track and field) at the 1920 Summer Olympics
Olympic athletes of South Africa
Medalists at the 1920 Summer Olympics
Afrikaner people
Cape Colony people
Olympic silver medalists in athletics (track and field)
Sportspeople from the Western Cape